Shane Connolly (born 1989 in County Kildare, Ireland) is an Irish sportsperson. He plays Gaelic football with his local club St Laurence's & has been a member of the Kildare senior inter-county team since 2011.

References

1989 births
Living people
Gaelic football goalkeepers
Kildare inter-county Gaelic footballers